Figueroles is a municipality in the comarca of Alcalatén, province of Castellón, Valencian Community,  Spain.

References

Municipalities in the Province of Castellón
Alcalatén